Live with Britten Sinfonia is a live album by Norwegian band Jaga Jazzist and English orchestra Britten Sinfonia. It was recorded in 2012 and released in May 2013 under Ninja Tune.

Track list

References

External links 
Live with Britten Sinfonia by Jaga Jazzist at iTunes.com

2013 live albums
Ninja Tune live albums
Jaga Jazzist albums
Live albums by Norwegian artists